Didargah-e Olya (also Romanized as Dīdārgāh-e ‘Olyā; also known as Dīdārgāh-e Bālā) is a village in Margha Rural District, in the Central District of Izeh County, Khuzestan Province, Iran. At the 2006 census, its population was 36, in 7 families.

References 

Populated places in Izeh County